Ta Sda is a khum (commune) of Sampov Loun District in Battambang Province in northwestern Cambodia.

Villages

 Veal Vong
 Ta Sda
 Chamkar Lhong
 Koun Phnum kharng Cheung
 Koun Phnum Tboung

References

Communes of Battambang province
Sampov Loun District